Departures is the second solo album by Australian musician Bernard Fanning, a follow-up to his 2005 #1 Australian charting album Tea & Sympathy, and the first since Fanning's band Powderfinger was disbanded in 2011. The album was released on 7 June 2013. The album heralds a departure from Fanning's debut 2005 effort of folk and roots in favour of a rock sound, more akin to his Powderfinger origins.

Track listing
"Tell Me How It Ends" – 3:41
"Limbo Stick" – 3:53
"Battleships" – 3:10
"Grow Around You" – 4:20
"Drake" – 3:48
"Call You Home" – 4:51
"Departures (Blue Toowong Skies)" – 4:20
"Zero Sum Game" – 4:07
"Here Comes the Sadist" – 3:35
"Inside Track" – 3:49
"Ghosts" (Retail bonus track) – 3:58
"Come Down On Your Side" - 3:27 (iTunes bonus track)

Charts
Departures debuted at number one on the ARIA Albums Chart dated 17 June 2013, becoming Fanning's second number-one album as a solo artist.

Certifications

See also
List of number-one albums of 2013 (Australia)

References

2013 albums
Bernard Fanning albums